Sparrow is a 2008 Hong Kong caper film produced and directed by Johnnie To.  The film stars veteran Milkyway Image cast and crew alumni Simon Yam, Gordon Lam, Law Wing-cheung and Kenneth Cheung as a small gang of pickpockets, with each member being mysteriously approached by a beautiful Taiwanese woman (Kelly Lin) with a hidden agenda.

Sparrow remained in pre-production for three years from 2005 to 2008, with To shooting the film in between other projects.  The film was selected in competition at the 58th Berlin International Film Festival, premiering during the festival in February 2008. It was released in Hong Kong on 19 June 2008.

Plot
Kei (Simon Yam) is the experienced leader of a team of pickpockets.(Pickpockets are also known as "Sparrows" in Hong Kong slang). He enjoys a carefree lifestyle taking photos with his vintage Rolleiflex. One day a dashing beauty, Chun-Lei (Kelly Lin), suddenly appears in Kei's viewfinder. Kei is mesmerized. Every member of his team has an encounter with her.... But behind Chun-lei's attractive facade lies a mysterious past and a mission to set herself free.

Cast

Production
Director Johnnie To shot the film in Hong Kong over a three-year period. In an interview, To said he and his crew would shoot every three or four months between projects.

Awards and nominations

See also
 Johnnie To filmography

References

External links
 Variety (Asia) Review
 The Sparrow at HK Cinemagic.com
 Berlin 2008 – Trailer for Johnnie To's The Sparrow
 Milkyway Image Official Website
 
 

Hong Kong romantic drama films
2000s Cantonese-language films
2008 films
Milkyway Image films
Films directed by Johnnie To
Hong Kong crime drama films